Minimol Vathicanil is a 1984 Indian Malayalam film, directed by Joshiy. The film stars Baby Shalini, Saritha, Ratheesh and Captain Raju in the lead roles. The film has musical score by M. S. Viswanathan.

Cast
Baby Shalini as Minimol
Ratheesh
Ravindran 
Captain Raju
Lalu Alex as Lalu
M. G. Soman
Saritha
Swapna
Pope John Paul II as himself

Production
Parts of the film were shot in Vatican City. Scenes involving Pope John Paul II lifting and kissing Shalini were included in the film.

Soundtrack
The music was composed by M. S. Viswanathan and the lyrics were written by Poovachal Khader.

References

External links

1984 films
1980s Malayalam-language films
Films scored by M. S. Viswanathan
Films directed by Joshiy